The Father and the Foreigner is a 2010 Italian drama film directed by Ricky Tognazzi. It is based on the novel Crime Novel by Giancarlo De Cataldo.

Plot 
Diego (Alessandro Gassman), an employee from Rome with a disabled son, meets Walid (Amr Waked), a rich Syrian businessman whose son is also handicapped. From their shared suffering blooms quite an unusual friendship, and the two dads start spending time together at Turkish baths, luxury shopping sprees, and meeting a mysterious sister in law named Zaira (Nadine Labaki). With a private jet, they head to Syria to see the plot of land Walid purchased for his son. Once back from that short and rather unusual trip, the pain preventing Diego and his wife to enjoy some passionate moments starts fading away, while Walid disappears following terrorist allegations. Tailed by the Secret Service in a suffocating and ambiguous Rome, Diego sets out looking for the man, uncovering a shockingly sad truth.

Cast 
Alessandro Gassman: Diego
Kseniya Rappoport: Lisa
Amr Waked: Walid
Leo Gullotta: Santini
Mohamed Zouaoui: Michel Arabesque
Nadine Labaki: Zaira
Emanuele Salce: Mazzoleni

See also
Movies about immigration to Italy

References

External links

2010 films
Italian drama films
Films directed by Ricky Tognazzi
2010 drama films
Films scored by Carlo Siliotto
2010s Italian films